3,4,5-Trimethoxybenzaldehyde is an organic compound. Within this class of compounds the chemical is categorized as a trisubstituted aromatic aldehyde.

Uses
3,4,5-Trimethoxybenzaldehyde can be used as an intermediate in the synthesis of some pharmaceutical drugs including trimethoprim, cintriamide, roletamide, trimethoquinol (aka tretoquinol), and trimazosin as well as some psychedelic phenethylamines.

Preparation

Industrial scale
For industrial applications the chemical is synthesized from p-cresol using aromatic substitution with bromine followed by nucleophilic substitution with sodium methoxide. Oxidation of the methyl group to an aldehyde can occur via various synthetic methods.

Laboratory scale
At the laboratory scale the chemical is conveniently synthesized from vanillin or from Eudesmic acid's Acyl chloride via Rosenmund reduction.

References

Phenol ethers
Benzaldehydes